Libertador San Martín is a municipality in Entre Ríos Province, central Argentina. It is located alongside National Route 131, near the city of Crespo, and about 60 km from provincial capital Paraná.

The town is home to the Universidad Adventista del Plata (founded in 1898) and the Sanatorio Adventista del Plata (founded in 1908). The majority of its residents are Seventh-day Adventists.

History 
The town had its beginnings in 1898, when a group of Christian, Seventh-day Adventist immigrants arrived in Entre Ríos province with the aim of opening a new school to teach agriculture and theology. From 1909 until the late 1960s, trains were an important means of transport, with the Puiggari train station being the main hub used by people travelling to and from Libertador. This is the reason Libertador San Martín is known today also as "Puiggari".

In 1971, Libertador earned official city status.

Gallery

Twin towns 
 Loma Linda, California

References

External links 
 Puiggari web
 Sanatorio Adventista del Plata website
 Libertador San Martín City Hall
 Universidad Adventista del Plata website

Populated places in Entre Ríos Province
Seventh-day Adventist Church
Cities in Argentina
Argentina
Entre Ríos Province